Elwin Soto Castro (born December 23, 1996) is a Mexican professional boxer who held the WBO junior flyweight title from 2019 to 2021. He is currently ranked as the world's fourth best junior flyweight by The Ring, seventh by BoxRec and eighth by TBRB.

Professional career

WBO junior flyweight champion

Soto vs. Acosta
Soto was scheduled to fight the reigning WBO light flyweight champion Ángel Acosta on June 21, 2019, in Acosta's fourth title defense. Soto was at the time the #15 ranked WBO light flyweight contender, and was considered a significant underdog going into the Acosta fight. Going into the twelfth round, Acosta was leading on the scorecards by 105-103, 106-102 and 107-101, while Soto managed to knock the champion down in the third round. Soto staggered Acosta with a left hook in the last round, and piled on volume, before referee Thomas Taylor abruptly stopped the fight at 23 seconds. The stoppage was considered controversial, as Acosta immediately protested the stoppage and didn't seem to be visibly hurt.

Soto vs. Heno
Soto was scheduled to make his first title defense against Edward Heno on October 24, 2019. The fight was set as the main event of the Golden Boy DAZN Thursday Night Fights. Soto won the closely contested fight, during which he was knocked down in the third round, by unanimous decision. The judges' scorecards reflected the close nature of the bout, with scores of 114-113, 115-112, and 115-112.

Soto moved up to flyweight for his next fight, being scheduled to fight Javier Alejandro Rendon in a non-title bout. Rendon's last three fights were at bantamweight, so the fight represented a move in weight for both fighters. Soto made quick work of his opponent, knocking him out with a body shot near the end of the first round.

Soto vs. Buitrago
For his second title defense, Soto was scheduled to fight the three-time world title challenger Carlos Buitrago, on October 30, 2020. Soto won the fight by a competitive unanimous decision, keeping his opponent at bay with his jab and power. Although one judge scored the bout 119-109, media outlets found the scores of 117-111 and 115-113 as more reflective of the contest.

His victory against Buitrago was Soto’s final fight under contract with Golden Boy Promotions, after which he signed with Matchroom Boxing USA. His signature with Matchroom opened the road to a title unification bout with Hiroto Kyoguchi, who was likewise under contract with Matchroom Boxing.

Soto vs. Takayama
For his third title defense, Soto was scheduled to fight the former five-time minimumweight world champion Katsunari Takayama, on May 8, 2021. Takuyama was ranked #11 by the IBF. The fight was set as the co-main event to the super middleweight title unification bout between Canelo Álvarez and Billy Joe Saunders. The fight was competitive throughout the first eight rounds, before Soto upped the volume in the ninth. The fight was stopped near the end of the round, despite Takayama returning shots and not being visibly hurt. The stoppage was considered highly controversial and referee Laurence Cole came under severe criticism.

Soto vs. Gonzalez
Soto was ordered to face the WBO junior flyweight mandatory title challenger Jonathan 'Bomba' Gonzalez on July 9, 2021. WBO gave the two of them a 20-day negotiation period in order to work out terms. As the two sides were unable to work out a deal, WBO extended the negotiation period to August 9, before the fight would go into an $80,000-minimum purse bid. All Star Boxing (Gonzalez’s promoter) and Matchroom Boxing (Soto’s promoter) came to an agreement on August 8, therefore avoiding the purse bid. The fight was officially announced for October 16, 2021, to be fought on the undercard of the Mikey Garcia versus Sandor Martin catchweight bout. Soto lost the fight by split decision, with two judges awarding Gonzalez a 116-112 scorecard, while the third judge scored the fight 116-112 for Soto. Soto was unable to successfully pressure and land on the outfighting Gonzalez, who appeared out of danger for the majority of the bout.

Post-championship career
Soto was scheduled to face Hekkie Budler in the main event of a TV Azteca broadcast card on June 25, 2022, at the Palenque del FEX in Mexicali, Mexico in a WBC light flyweight title eliminator. Soto lost the fight by unanimous decision, with all three judges scoring the fight 114–113 for Budler. Budler created a lot of problems for Soto with his boxing ability. Soto was knocked down in the twelfth round, which proved crucial on the official scorecards.

Professional boxing record

See also
List of world light-flyweight boxing champions
List of Mexican boxing world champions

References

External links

Elwin Soto - Profile, News Archive & Current Rankings at Box.Live

1996 births
Living people
Boxers from Baja California
Mexican male boxers
Light-flyweight boxers
World light-flyweight boxing champions
World Boxing Organization champions
People from Mexicali Municipality